MR.DIY is a Malaysia-based home improvement retailer. It is a part of Mr D.I.Y. Group (M) Berhad, and provides home improvement products for do-it-yourself projects through online and offline stores. As of April 2021, Creador-backed Mr D.I.Y. Group owns and operates over 1000 stores in Malaysia.

It operates over 2,251 stores in 10 Asian and European markets, including Malaysia, Thailand, Indonesia, the Philippines, India, Turkey, Spain, Singapore, Brunei, and Cambodia.

History
MR. DIY was started as a consumer hardware store in Jalan Tuanku Abdul Rahman, Kuala Lumpur, Malaysia in July 2005. The company then expanded to open stores in Aeon shopping mall in 2009, Tesco Setia Alam in Selangor in 2010, Giant Shopping Outlet and Borneo Hypermall in 2014, Palm Square Commercial Centre in 2017. 

In November 2021, MR. DIY opened its doors in Europe in Turkey in Meydan Istanbul Mall. Also, In January 2022, they opened up a store in Talavera de la Reina, Spain and a second store was opened in Madrid. As of October 2022, there are 24 stores in Turkey and 12 stores in Spain.

The company, headquartered in Selangor, Malaysia has other subsidiaries that includes MR.TOY and MR.DOLLAR. Including its subsidiaries, the company operates 900 stores in the country as of December 2021. The company began e-commerce operations in 2018 through its online store and on Shops. To manage the e-commerce warehouse, MR.DIY installed 23 robots in their warehouse.

MR.DIY was publicly listed on the Bursa Malaysia (MYX) in October 2020. The company reported a cumulative revenue of RM 2.6 billion as of Q4 2020 and was valued at RM 21.4 billion.

In April 2021, the company launched a storefront format called MR.DIY Express for rural communities.  In January 2022, MR.DIY opened the 800th store at Pavilion Bukit Jalil. In addition, the store also includes a MR.TOY store-within-the-store.

In May 2022, the group opened MR.DIY Plus, a  mega retail store, MR.DIY Plus at MidValley Megamall. The group also hit 1000 stores in August 2022.

Awards
MR. DIY was the winner in the Retailer – Home Improvement category at the World Branding Awards in 2018, 2019, 2020 and 2021. It also won the Retail Market Leadership Award at the Frost & Sullivan Best Practices Award 2020, 2021 and 2022. MR.DIY was accorded a gold award in Putra Brand Award's Retail Category in 2021.

In 2021 and 2022, Deloitte named MR.DIY as one of four recipients at the inaugural “Malaysia’s Best Managed Companies Awards”. MR.DIY also won three awards at the Alpha SEA 11th Institutional Investor Corporate Awards 2021, just one year after listing on Bursa Malaysia.

Corporate Social Responsibility 
During the COVID-19 outbreak, MR. DIY notably distributed personal protective equipment (PPE) and face masks to COVID-19 hospitals, government clinics, police and public in Malaysia. MR.DIY, together with Majlis Perbandaran Hulu Selangor (MPHS) initiated a massive clean-up of Sungai Kedondong in 2021. MR.DIY also jointly organized the 5th ‘DIY Made Simple 2021’ competition with Universiti Malaya’s Community & Sustainability Centre (UMCares). MR.DIY’s #DIY4UM initiative in 2021 distributed over RM3.6 million across 12,000 undergraduates from Universiti Malaya through Touch and Go e-wallet for their transition back to on-campus learning.

Under the #DIY4UTAR initiative, 3,817 students from Universiti Tunku Abdul Rahman (UTAR) Sungai Long received hygiene kits from MR.DIY. The company supports environmental causes under a separate community outreach programme, called #DIY4Sungai, by cleaning up Sungai Melaka. Over 1,000 kgs of garbage were picked up and disposed of.

MR.DIY announced the completion of a two-year contribution worth RM408,288 under its #DIY4ZooNegara initiative, which included funds for the adoption of the three animals; two giraffes and a Malaysian tiger.

Under the #DIY4Universiti initiative, MR.DIY distributes 85,000 free test kits to local universities in Peninsular Malaysia.

The company notably joined Yayasan Telekom Malaysia and Yayasan Sukarelawan Siswa in Malaysia's largest Gutta Percha Tree Planting project, planting more than 1,000 trees in Taman Botani Putrajaya, in a 24-hour period. The Gutta Percha project is recognised by The Malaysia Book of Records for its effort to plant 5,017 trees across 23 locations in Peninsular Malaysia.

MR.DIY also activated a school aid programme called "The Healthy Meals", to primary schools in Selangor. It has already benefited 737 students in five primary schools. MR.DIY joined with the non-government organisation, Soroptimist International Club of Damansara (SID), and went to Kampung Gana in Kota Marudu, Sabah, to distribute everyday essentials to 40 families in the village. MR.DIY contributed RM300,000 to (formerly known as PPUM Patients Welfare Fund), in conjunction with the PPUMCare Run event that was held recently at UM Arena, Universiti Malaya. The Run was organised by Universiti Malaya Medical Centre (UMMC) to raise funds to be used to cover the cost of treatment for underprivileged patients.

Financials

References

External links

 

Malaysian companies established in 2005
Home improvement companies
2020 initial public offerings
Companies listed on Bursa Malaysia